The 2016 Atlético Nacional season was the 69th season in the club's history. The team competed in the Categoría Primera A, Copa Colombia, Superliga Colombiana, Copa Libertadores, Copa Sudamericana and FIFA Club World Cup.

Players

First-team squad

Out on loan

Transfers
Source: Soccerway

In

Out

Pre-season and friendlies

Competitions

Overall

Superliga Colombiana

Categoría Primera A

Torneo Apertura

Home-away summary

Match results

†: Matches postponed due to participation in the Copa Libertadores.

Knockout phase

Quarterfinals

Semifinals

Torneo Finalización

Home-away summary

Match results

†: Matches postponed due to participation in the Copa Libertadores and Copa Sudamericana.

Knockout phase

Quarterfinals

Semifinals

Copa Libertadores

Second stage

Final stages

Round of 16

Quarterfinals

Semifinals

Finals

Copa Sudamericana

Atlético Nacional qualified as champion of the 2016 Superliga Colombiana.

Elimination stages

First stage

Second stage

Final stages

Round of 16

Quarterfinals

Semifinals

Finals

Copa Sudamericana finals cancelled because of LaMia Airlines Flight 2933 accident involving Chapecoense. On December 5, CONMEBOL awarded Chapecoense the title of the tournament, while Atlético Nacional received the "CONMEBOL Centenario Fair Play" award.

Copa Colombia

Atlético Nacional qualified for the round of 16 after qualify to the 2016 Copa Libertadores.

Round of 16

Quarterfinals

Semifinals

Final

FIFA Club World Cup
Atlético Nacional secured their spot by winning the 2016 Copa Libertadores.

Statistics

Squad statistics

Source: Soccerway

Goals

Disciplinary record

References

External links
Atlético Nacional - Official Website
Soccerway - Atlético Nacional

Atlético Nacional seasons